Gérard Millet (born January 20, 1939 in Melun, Seine-et-Marne) is a member of the National Assembly of France.  He represents the Seine-et-Marne department, and is a member of the Union for a Popular Movement.

References

1939 births
Living people
People from Melun
Politicians from Île-de-France
Union for a Popular Movement politicians
Deputies of the 13th National Assembly of the French Fifth Republic
Knights of the Ordre national du Mérite